Consolidated Theatres may refer to 

Consolidated Theatres (Hawaii)
Consolidated Theatres (North Carolina)